The Light on the Island, by Helene Glidden, recounts her early years in the lighthouse on Patos Island in Washington State's San Juan Islands. Set during Edward Durgan's eight-year term as lighthouse keeper from 1905–1913, it offers a child's perspective on a number of adult themes, including death, murder, strong language, and smugglers. It has been suggested that many of the events in the book could not have happened as described and that many of the characters were not on the island, either from flawed memory or the desire to make the story more interesting.

External links
Reviews on Amazon.com
Reviews on Goodreads.com
"Light Up" Your Destinations, editorial in 48north.com
Keepers of the Patos Light discussion of errors in the book

1951 American novels
Novels set in Washington (state)
American autobiographical novels
San Juan County, Washington
Novels set on islands
Coward-McCann books